János Nehadoma (born 20 August 1901, date of death unknown) was a Hungarian soccer center forward. He began his career in the Italian Serie B before moving to the American Soccer League where he shared the 1928–29 scoring title. Later in his career he played for Serie A club Fiorentina. After retiring from playing, he spent several seasons as a club manager.

Playing
Nehadoma was born in Budapest, Hungary. He began his senior career with Húsiparosok SC, a Hungarian second division club composed of workers from Budapest's meat packing industry. Amid a series of scandals rocking the league, he joined Italian Serie B club A.C. Pistoiese in 1925. He spent only two seasons with the club before leaving Europe for the United States, as foreigners were no longer allowed to play football in Italy. Nehadoma arrived in the U.S., signing with the Brooklyn Wanderers at the end of the 1927–28 American Soccer League season. He played seven games, scoring seven goals for Brooklyn. The next season, Nehadoma scored forty-three goals, tying Werner Nilsen for the scoring title. In the fall of 1929, he began with the Wanderers before moving to Brooklyn Hakoah for five games. He returned to the Wanderers for the spring 1930 season. In 1931, Nehadoma had returned to Italy, re-signing with Pistoiese. He saw time in only thirteen league games before moving to Livorno in 1932. He spent one season there, scoring 26 league goals, before moving to the Serie A with Fiorentina. However, he lasted only three seasons at the top of Italian soccer before returning to Serie B with Modena F.C. He retired after playing seven games with Modena.

Coaching
In 1941, Nehadoma was hired to manage Serie A club Atalanta B.C. After five seasons, he moved to A.C. Mantova of Serie B. He spent only one season in Mantova before retiring in 1948.

Career statistics

Club

References

1901 births
Year of death missing
Association football forwards
Hungarian footballers
Hungarian expatriate footballers
American Soccer League (1921–1933) players
Serie A players
Serie B players
Brooklyn Wanderers players
Brooklyn Hakoah players
U.S. Pistoiese 1921 players
U.S. Livorno 1915 players
ACF Fiorentina players
Modena F.C. players
Expatriate soccer players in the United States
Expatriate footballers in Italy
Expatriate football managers in Italy
Hungarian expatriate sportspeople in Italy
Hungarian expatriate sportspeople in the United States
Serie A managers
U.S. Triestina Calcio 1918 managers
Atalanta B.C. managers
Hungarian football managers
Footballers from Budapest